3-Methyl-4-octanolide, also called β-methyl-γ-octalactone or 5-butyldihydro-4-methylfuran-2-one can be either of two chemical products of the lactone family:
 cis-3-Methyl-4-octanolide, or "whisky lactone", the component of oak wood that imparts flavor to whisky
 trans-3-Methyl-4-octanolide, also found in oak wood.